Cordova Army Airfield is a former United States Army airfield located one nautical mile (1.8 km) east of the central business district of Cordova, a city in the Valdez-Cordova Census Area of the U.S. state of Alaska. Following its closure, it was redeveloped into Cordova Municipal Airport

See also

 Alaska World War II Army Airfields

References

Airfields of the United States Army Air Forces in Alaska
Airports in Chugach Census Area, Alaska
Closed installations of the United States Army
Cordova, Alaska